Allingham is a surname. Notable people with the surname include:

 Cedric Allingham, British fictional contactee of the 1950s, who claimed to have encountered the pilot of a Martian spacecraft
 Helen Allingham (née Helen Mary Elizabeth Paterson) (1848–1926), watercolour painter and illustrator of the Victorian era
 Henry Allingham (1896–2009), supercentenarian, World War I veteran and briefly the world's oldest living man
 Herbert Allingham (1867–1936), English editor and writer
 Herbert William Allingham (1862–1904), British surgeon
 John Till Allingham (1776–1812), English dramatist
 Margery Allingham (1904–1966), English crime writer born in Ealing, London
 Maurice Allingham (1896–1993), Australian rules footballer
 Michael Allingham (born 1943), British economist
 Mike Allingham (born 1965), Scottish cricketer
 William Allingham (1824–1889), Irish man of letters and poet

Places:
 Allingham, Queensland, town in Australia

English-language surnames